In organic chemistry, hydrovinylation is the formal insertion of an alkene into the C-H bond of ethylene.  The more general reaction, hydroalkenylation, is the formal insertion of an alkene into the C-H bond of any terminal alkene. The reaction is catalyzed by metal complexes.  A representative reaction is the conversion of styrene and ethylene to 3-phenybutene:

Ethylene dimerization
The dimerization of ethylene gives 1-butene is another example of a hydrovinylation.  In the Dimersol and Alphabutol Processes, alkenes are dimerized for the production of gasoline and for comonomers such as 1-butene.  These processes operate at several refineries across the world at the scales of about 400,000 tons/year (2006 report).  1-Butene is amenable to isomerization to 2-butenes, which is used in Olefin conversion technology to give propylene.

Hydroarylation
Hydroarylation is again a special case of hydrovinylation.  Hydroarylation has been demonstrated for alkyne and alkene substrates.  An early example was provided by the Murai reaction, which involves the insertion of alkenes into a C-H bond of acetophenone.  The keto group directs the regiochemistry, stabilizing an aryl intermediate.

When catalyzed by palladium carboxylates, a key step is electrophilic aromatic substitution to give a Pd(II) aryl intermediate. Gold behaves similarly.  Hydropyridination is a similar reaction, but entails addition of a pyridyl-H bond to alkenes and alkynes.

In organic synthesis
As first reported by Alderson, Jenner and Lindsey, hydrovinylation uses rhodium- and ruthenium-based catalysts. Catalysts based on iron, cobalt, nickel, and palladium have also been demonstrated. The addition can be done highly regio- and stereoselectively, the choices of metal centers, ligands, substrates and counterions often play very important role. N-heterocyclic carbene complexes of Ni allow the selective preparations of functionalized geminal olefins or 1,1-disubstituted alkenes.

References
 

Alkenes
Carbon-carbon bond forming reactions